A flammagenitus cloud, also known as a flammagenitus, pyrocumulus cloud, or fire cloud, is a dense cumuliform cloud associated with fire or volcanic eruptions. A flammagenitus is similar dynamically in some ways to a firestorm, and the two phenomena may occur in conjunction with each other. However, either may occur without the other.

Formation 

A flammagenitus cloud is produced by the intense heating of the air from the surface. The intense heat induces convection, which causes the air mass to rise to a point of stability, usually in the presence of moisture. Phenomena such as volcanic eruptions and forest fires can induce formation of this cloud, by mechanisms similar to those that form homogenitus clouds. The presence of a low-level jet stream can enhance its formation. Condensation of ambient moisture (moisture already present in the atmosphere), as well as moisture evaporated from burnt vegetation or volcanic outgassing (water vapour being a dominant component of volcanic eruptive gases), occurs readily on particles of ash.

Flammageniti contain severe turbulence, manifesting as strong gusts at the surface, which can exacerbate a large conflagration. A large flammagenitus, particularly one associated with a volcanic eruption, may also produce lightning. This is a process not yet fully understood, but is probably in some way associated with charge separation induced by severe turbulence, and, perhaps, by the nature of the particles of ash in the cloud. Large flammageniti can contain temperatures well below freezing, and the electrostatic properties of any ice that forms may also play a role. A flammagenitus that produces lightning is actually a type of cumulonimbus, a thundercloud, and is called cumulonimbus flammagenitus. The World Meteorological Organization formerly classified flammagenitus and cumulonimbus flammagenitus respectively as cumulus (mediocris or congestus) and cumulonimbus. In 2017, the WMO International Cloud Atlas chose flammagenitus as the formal name of these clouds.

Appearance 

Flammagenitus is often grayish to brown in color because of the ash and smoke associated with the fire. It also tends to expand because the ash involved in the cloud's formation increases the amount of condensation nuclei. This poses a problem, as the cloud can trigger a thunderstorm, from which the lightning can start another fire.

Effects on wildfires 
A flammagenitus cloud can help or hinder a fire. Sometimes, the moisture from the air condenses in the cloud and falls as rain, often extinguishing the fire. There have been numerous examples of a large firestorm being extinguished by the flammagenitus that it created. However, if the fire is large enough, the cloud may continue to grow, and become a type of cumulonimbus cloud known as a cumulonimbus flammagenitus, which may produce lightning and start another fire. Even if there is no lightning, a cloud of this type can cause a sudden increase in wind speed, which could dramatically worsen the wildfire that created the cloud.

References

External links 
 

Cumulus
Wildfire ecology
Wildfires
Volcanism